Chunkara (Aymara for "pointed mountain", Hispanicized spelling Chungara) is a mountain in the Sillapaka mountain range in the Andes of Peru, about  high . It is located in the Puno Region, Lampa Province, Paratia District, northeast of Sillapaka.

References

Mountains of Peru
Mountains of Puno Region